Can We Go Home Now is the ninth studio album by the folk trio the Roches, released in 1995 on Rykodisc.

Track listing

 "The Great Gaels"
 "Move"
 "You (Make My Life Come True)"
 "Christlike"
 "Home Away From Home"
 "Can We Go Home Now"
 "When You're Ready"
 "I'm Someone Who Loves You"
 "So"
 "Holidays"
 "My Winter Coat"

References

1995 albums
The Roches albums
Rykodisc albums